is a Japanese mecha anime series and the fifteenth mainline entry in Sunrise's long-running Gundam franchise. The series is directed by both Hiroshi Kobayashi and Ryō Andō and written by Ichirō Ōkouchi. It premiered in October 2022 on the JNN stations TBS and MBS.

The Witch from Mercury marks the first mainline Gundam TV anime production in seven years since Mobile Suit Gundam: Iron-Blooded Orphans and the first TV series in the franchise to feature a female protagonist. The series revolves around themes of the dangers of emerging technologies alongside political corruption, capitalism, and revenge.



Plot
In the distant future, humanity has advanced into space and switched to the new calendar system of Ad Stella (AS). The solar system was split between the inhabitants of space colonies, also called "Spacians" and the Earth-born "Earthians", with a vast economic inequality between the two.

Vanadis Institute created an advanced man-machine system called GUND, which would enable humans to survive in the harsh environment of space, but the technology is later employed for military uses, leading to the creation of "Gundams", mobile suits who use the GUND Format to increase the performance of its pilots while risking their lives. Because of this defect, many pilots were crippled or killed using the GUND Format, and because the team responsible for its development was mostly composed of women, all females somehow involved with the GUND Format, whether researchers or pilots, became known as "witches". 

In response, the Mobile Suit Development Council, led by the top mobile suit development companies, ordered a permanent ban on the GUND Format and all its applications, with council member Delling Rembran deploying the special forces team Dominicus to destroy the Vanadis research facility Fólkvangr, killing everyone aboard to erase all traces of the technology. Only two people narrowly survived: mobile suit test pilot Elnora Samaya and her four-year-old daughter Ericht Samaya.

In AS 122, 21 years after the Vanadis incident, Suletta Mercury transfers from Mercury to the Asticassia School of Technology, an academic institute run by the megacorporation Benerit Group. Upon arrival, she encounters a girl escaping the institute, Miorine Rembran, who wants to escape from the control of her father, Delling. As their paths cross in the academy with different ambitions and goals, Suletta will have to prove her worth as a pilot as she steps into the academy alongside the Gundam Aerial, a mobile suit built with the forbidden GUND Format technology.

Characters

Main characters

 
 The series's main protagonist. Suletta, a 17-year-old female Spacian and a second-year student in the piloting department who transferred to the Asticassia School of Technology from Mercury. At Mercury, she was trained to be a mobile suit pilot from a young age and was later sent to the academy by her mother. She was shown to be a timid girl who has trouble communicating with people other than her mother. Despite being a Spacian, she becomes affiliated with the Earth House.
 Suletta pilots the XVX-016 Gundam Aerial, a GUND-ARM mobile suit developed by the Shin Sei Development Corporation on Mercury whose main feature are the "Bit Staves", remote controlled drones that can be used both for offense and defense. It is later upgraded into the XVX-016RN Gundam Aerial Rebuild.
 
 
 An attractive and academically distinguished second-year female Spacian student in the management strategy department. Miorine is the only daughter of Delling Rembran, the president of the Benerit Group and chairman of the school's board. Her late mother was a botanist, and Miorine kept a small greenhouse on school grounds in her memory. She has a strong rebellious feeling towards her father, who barely acknowledges her beyond her status as his family.

Asticassia School of Technology
 
 
 An heir to Jeturk Heavy Machinery, one of the group's three branches, and a third-year student in the piloting department. Guel has a rough temperament and is quick to anger. As the ace pilot of Jeturk House, he has absolute confidence in his own skills, including the rank of "Holder" to signify his status as the top duelist at the school, which makes him Miorine's fiancé, a position he loses to Suletta after he is defeated by her. After knowing more about Suletta, Guel becomes infatuated with her, to the point of asking her in marriage. Due to his repeated defeats, he was kicked out of the Jeturk House, now living solely away from the group.
 Guel pilots the MD-0032G Guel's Dilanza, a heavily modified Dilanza developed by the Jeturk Heavy Machinery and used primarily for close combat. He later switches to the more powerful MD-0064 Darilbalde, also focusing on close combat.
 
 
 The top pilot backed by Peil Technologies, one of the group's three branches and a third-year student in the piloting department. In truth, Elan's attendance in school and participation in duels is secretly performed by Enhanced Persons, unregistered body doubles created to handle the stresses of the GUND-Format technology. The first enhanced person, codenamed "Number 4" is a taciturn and solitary person, who does not open his heart to anyone in school. He has an interest in Suletta due to her relation to the GUND Format tech. After his defeat against her, he was disposed by Peil Technologies in preparation for the next Enhanced Person body double, who intends to seduce Suletta as part of Peil's plan to seize Aerial and its secrets.
 As a Mobile Suit pilot, he pilots the FP/A-77 Gundam Pharact, a long-ranged sniper unit developed by Peil Technologies using the GUND-Format tech.
 
 
 An adopted child of the CEO of Grassley Defense Systems, one of the group's three branches. A third-year student in the piloting department who leads Grassley House. Although still a student, Shaddiq has shown his skill in business and is a candidate for next generation executive.
 He pilots the CFK-029 Michaelis, a mobile suit developed by Grassley Defense Systems as a successor to the Beguir-Beu equipped with the Beam Bracer, which uses  Non-Kinetic Effectors to disable GUND-Arm mobile suits.
 
 
 An Earthian second year student in the Mechanics department who was born on Earth. She welcomes Suletta into the Earth House and convinces the other members to accept her, but also works in the shadows with Shaddiq under orders of an unknown party.
 
 
 A first-year Earthian student representing Earth House, a group that represents Earthian workers. She has a gruff personality and reacts aggressively to Spacians who discriminate against Earthians, sometimes getting into physical fights.
 She pilots the MSJ-105CC Demi Trainer Chuchu Custom as her main mobile suit, equipped with a sniper rifle for ranged combat.
 
 
 A third-year management strategy student and the leader of the Earth House.
 
 
 A second-year mechanical department student belonging to the Earth House.
 
 
 A second-year mechanical department student belonging to the Earth House.
 
 
 A third-year mechanical department student belonging to the Earth House.
 
 
 A first-year management strategy student belonging to the Earth House. She is popular with the male students of Asticassia.
 
 
 A third-year mechanical department student belonging to the Earth House. She has an interest in divination.

Benerit Group
The  is a major business conglomerate of 157 corporations in mobile suit manufacturing led by president Delling Rembran. They are the leader in mobile suit industry, making them the most powerful corporations throughout known space who also wields much authority on Earth. However, for much of that authority, they oppress Earthians, deploying their personal mobile suits to disrupt protests of said Earthians against exploitations by Spaciens.
 
 
 A former military man who used his influence with Cathedra to plan and order a raid on the Fólkvangr lab where the "GUND Format" technology was being developed, to stop the research before it was finished and the Ochs Earth Corporation along with it. Many years later, Delling became the president of the Benerit Group. In addition, Delling created the Asticassia School of Technology, both to solidify his influence and train the next generation of elites. Delling's Darwinian philosophy that only the strong deserve to survive extends to the policies of his business, his school, and even his own daughter, declaring that only the strongest mobile suit pilot is worthy of marrying her. He is also the supervising representative of Cathedra.

Jeturk Heavy Machinery 
 is a corporation and one of three branches of the Benerit Group led by Vim Jeturk.
 
 
 The CEO of Jeturk Heavy Machinery, and father to Guel. He's an ambitious person who sees Delling as a thorn to his personal agenda, especially his philosophies.

Grassley Defense Systems 
 is a corporation and one of three branches of the Benerit Group led by Sarius Zenelli.
 
 
 The CEO of Grassley Defense Systems, and Shaddiq's adoptive father.

Peil Technologies 
 is a corporation and one of three branches of the Benerit Group led by a team of four CEOs who manage the company via a parliamentary system.
 
 
 One of the four co-CEOs of Peil Technologies.
 
 
 One of the four co-CEOs of Peil Technologies.
 
 
 One of the four co-CEOs of Peil Technologies.
 
 
 One of the four co-CEOs of Peil Technologies.
 
 
 An employee of Peil Technologies and a former member of Vanadis Institute. Belmeria was the handler of Elan Ceres. Following Elan's loss to Suletta, she pleaded with the Peil CEOs to spare him, to no avail. She is later assigned to Gund-Arm Inc. as their liaison with Peil Technologies.

Others 
 
 
 A pilot stationed in the group's Dominicus special forces squad. He was among the soldiers who raided the Fólkvangr lab. 21 years after the Vanadis incident, he had become a ship captain at Dominicus.
 Kenanji piloted the CEK-040 Beguir-Beu, a mobile suit developed by Grassley Defense Systems armed with remote-controlled pods which disable mobile suits using GUND Format systems.

Vanadis Institute / Ochs Earth
  / 
 
 Ericht's mother and a test pilot employed by Ochs Earth, a company that researched and developed the GUND-Format technology for use in Mobile Suits. In the past, she had a GUND right arm transplanted by Cardo in order to save her life. Following the Fólkvangr Incident, she escaped the destruction of the institute and went into hiding. Years after the incident, she joined Shin Sei Development Corporation on Mercury in order to continue development on the GUND-Format and was eventually appointed as their president. She also went under an alias as well, as she dons a mask to hide her true identity as Lady Prospera.
 Elnora herself test piloted the XGF-02 Gundam Lfrith, a GUND-Format Mobile Suit developed by the institute. However, Elnora wasn't able to activate it until it's Permet Code was connected to Ericht.
 
 
 Ericht's father who sacrificed himself to give Elnora and Ericht a chance to escape.
 
 
  The inventor of GUND Format technology, she was one of the biggest proponents of Gundam development to aid space exploration and developed the Gundam Lfrith. She is killed when Fólkvangr is raided by Cathedra.

Dawn of Fold

Production and release
The series was first revealed by Sunrise at the 2nd Gundam Conference held on September 15, 2021, under Bandai Namco Group's "Gundam Project". It is the first mainline series in 7 years since Iron Blooded Orphans with Bandai Namco Group cooperating with external partners called "G-PARTNER" to bring young people in their teens all over the world. A Teaser PV was released on March 29, 2022, revealing the main mecha and a female character alongside a prologue episode that premiered on July 14, 2022. On June 17, Sunrise revealed the series's main plot, characters, staff, and a confirmed air date alongside an overview for the Prologue Episode. The staff working in the series were composed by director Hiroshi Kobayashi, with Ryō Andō serving as co-director; Ichirō Ōkouchi overseeing and writing scripts; mogmo designing the characters; Marie Tagashira, Shuri Toida, and Hirotoshi Takaya adapting mogmo's designs for animation; JNTHED, Kanetake Ebikawa, Wataru Inada, Ippei Gyōbu, Kenji Teraoka, and Takayuki Yanase designing the mechs; Shinya Kusumegi, Kanta Suzuki, and Seizei Maeda animating the mechs. Producer Naohiro Ogata mentioned in an online press conference that the story will be set in an academy and that it will feature the first female main protagonist in the mainline series, and that he will create a work that is conscious of the increase in new fans. On July 14, information regarding the Prologue episode were revealed at "GUNDAM NEXT FUTURE -LINK THE UNIVERSE-", which was the first public event for "PROLOGUE".

The series' story and theme were all done by Ōkouchi, Kobayashi and Andō themselves, basing it on the tech companies competing for profits and control in the industry alongside elements from witch trials in the early modern period, reflecting the theme surrounding the GUND-Format technology and the people involved in its research, comparing it to a "curse" by the normal people. Ōkouchi made the decision to use a school setting, in order to broaden the appeal: "He was conscious of making it enjoyable for all ages by simultaneously drawing the main character of the story, the young generation's personalities, and the adult drama." However, Ōkouchi also made sure to feature "dark turning points and disturbing stories" that are emblematic of the Gundam series. Notably, The Witch from Mercury is the first Gundam TV series to feature a female protagonist and fourth in the franchise overall (after École du Ciel, SEED C.E. 73: Stargazer, and Twilight AXIS).

Media

Anime
Mobile Suit Gundam: The Witch from Mercury officially premiered on all JNN stations in Japan, including MBS and TBS on October 2, 2022, with the Prologue episode premiering on July 14, 2022, four months before the series' airing. Yoasobi performed the series' first opening theme  while yama will perform the second opening theme "slash". Shiyui and Ryo performed the ending theme . Takashi Ohmama composed the music for the series. A second season will begin airing in April 2023.

At the 2022 San Diego Comic-Con, it was announced that the series will be simulcast outside of Japan. Crunchyroll licensed the series through Sunrise. Medialink licensed the series in Southeast Asia and is streaming it on their Ani-One Asia YouTube channel, Netflix, and bilibili. It is also being streamed on GundamInfo YouTube channel on Asia and Oceania. An English dub was released via Crunchyroll on January 30, 2023. This marks the first time the Gundam franchise that featured the Texas-based talent produced in what was Funimation,
who acquired Crunchyroll via its parent Sony in 2021 and rebranded itself the following year.

The English dub received controversy due to the decision to have Suletta Mercury be voiced by a white voice actor Jill Harris. Suletta Mercury is implied to have Middle Eastern or North African heritage and her father's name Nadim Samaya has Arabic, Hebrew and Indian origins. Professional voice actors criticized Crunchyroll for changing their longstanding remote work production pipeline to hiring primarily from the local Texas area, which they said would limit diversity in casting. They also noted that Texas is a right-to-work state, which would limit actors' ability to join a union or bargain collectively.

Episode list

Print
An official web novel titled , written by Ichirō Ōkouchi, was released by Sunrise on their official website on October 2, 2022. The web novel serves as a link between the Prologue and the main series and is told from the point of view of the Gundam Aerial. A live reading of the novel was released on YouTube on November 13, 2022, with Kana Ichinose as the narrator. The anime was later adapted into an ongoing light novel in Kadokawa Shoten's Gundam Ace magazine in January 2023, written by Yūya Takashima with illustrations by Shūei Takagi. The novel adapts both the Prologue and main storylines.

A side-story manga adaptation written by Kō Yoneyama and illustrated by Chika Tōjō, with original character designs by mogmo and planning cooperation by Hisadake, will begin serialization in Kadokawa Shoten's Gundam Ace magazine in Q2 2023. The manga is set years after the Vanadis incident and focuses on a witch named Vilda Miren.

Merchandise
Alongside other merchandise releases, the series is also part of the long-running Gunpla line of plastic model kits by Bandai Spirits. Kits based on the Mobile Suits in the series were released in 1/144 scale, while an HG and SDEX model of the Gundam Aerial have been released. A 1/100 scale Full Mechanics kit of the Gundam Aerial is also set to release in 2023. Also, both Robot Spirits and Chogokin figure versions of the Gundam Aerial were also announced and released.

Shortly after the release of the series, Sunrise partnered with Yamazaki Baking for a cross-promotion following a string of Internet memes stemming from the Bic Camera branch in Akihabara stocking empty shelves of the Gundam Aerial model kit with YBC Aerial corn chips.

Notes

References

External links
 Official site 
 

2022 anime ONAs
2022 anime television series debuts
2023 manga
Anime and manga controversies
Casting controversies in television
Crunchyroll anime
Fiction set on Mercury (planet)
Gundam anime and manga
Kadokawa Shoten manga
Mainichi Broadcasting System original programming
Medialink
Race-related controversies in animation
Sunrise (company)
TBS Television (Japan) original programming
Television shows written by Ichirō Ōkouchi
Upcoming anime television series